Gianola is a surname. Notable people with the surname include: 

Daniel Gianola (born 1947), American geneticist
Ezio Gianola (born 1960), Italian motorcycle road racer
Gaetano Gianola, Italian-American mobster 
Jeff Gianola (born 1955), American news anchor

See also
Giarola